Josh Neufeld (born August 9, 1967) is an alternative cartoonist known for his nonfiction comics on subjects like Hurricane Katrina, international travel, and finance, as well as his collaborations with writers like Harvey Pekar and Brooke Gladstone. He is the writer/artist of A.D.: New Orleans After the Deluge, and the illustrator of The Influencing Machine: Brooke Gladstone on the Media.

Biography and career highlights
Born in New York to parents Leonard Neufeld and artist Martha Rosler, Neufeld spent most of his youth in California (San Diego and San Francisco), and then moved back to New York City during his teenage years. He graduated from the Fiorello H. LaGuardia High School in 1985 and Oberlin College with a B.A. in Art History in 1989. Shortly after graduating from college, he spent over a year backpacking with his then-girlfriend (now his wife) through Southeast Asia and Central Europe, and living for a period in the Czech Republic.

As a child, Neufeld's influences were Belgian cartoonist Hergé's The Adventures of Tintin, Goscinny & Uderzo's Asterix, and the Curt Swan-Murphy Anderson issues of Action Comics and Superman. Later in life, as he gravitated toward alternative comics, Neufeld was inspired by the writing and work of Scott McCloud, Chris Ware, and Dan Clowes; and the real-life stories of Joe Sacco, Harvey Pekar, and David Greenberger.

In 2010, Neufeld was invited to act as a representative of the United States Department of State's Speaker and Specialist program, which sends Americans abroad as cultural "ambassadors." In March 2010, Neufeld spent two weeks in Burma as part of the program; in October he visited Egypt, Algeria, Bahrain, and Israel/Palestine as part of the same program.

Neufeld was a 2012–2013 Knight-Wallace Fellow in journalism at the University of Michigan; he was the first so-called "comics journalist" to be awarded a Knight-Wallace Fellowship.

In October 2014, Neufeld was a Master Artist at the Atlantic Center for the Arts, where he led a three-week residency for mid-career cartoonists.

Neufeld is also a comics educator. He is on the faculty of the School of Visual Arts, and the summer faculty of Michigan State University. He is the lead faculty mentor for the Comics & Graphic Narratives concentration at the Solstice Low-Residency MFA Program of Pine Manor College. He was a visiting professor at CUNY Queens College in the spring of 2017, and returned in the same role in Spring 2020.

Neufeld currently resides with his wife, the writer Sari Wilson, and their daughter, in Brooklyn, New York.

Works

Creator-owned titles
Neufeld was awarded a 2004 grant from the Xeric Foundation for his graphic novel, A Few Perfect Hours (and Other Stories From Southeast Asia & Central Europe), a collection of real-life stories about his travel experiences. He is the creator of the comic book series The Vagabonds (published by Alternative Comics), and co-creator (with high school friend Dean Haspiel) of Keyhole (Millennium/Modern and Top Shelf Productions) and (with R. Walker) Titans of Finance: True Tales of Money and Business (Alternative Comics).

A.D.: New Orleans After the Deluge 
In 2005, shortly after Hurricane Katrina struck the Gulf Coast, Neufeld spent three weeks as an American Red Cross volunteer in Biloxi, Mississippi. The blog he kept about that experience turned into a self-published book, Katrina Came Calling (2006). Later, Neufeld was asked to write the introduction to a book called Signs of Life: Surviving Katrina, a collection of photos of the hand-made signs that appeared in New Orleans and along the Gulf Coast following Hurricane Katrina. Profits from sales of the book went two organizations still working in the area: Common Ground Relief and Hands On Network.

In 2007–2008, Neufeld wrote and drew A.D.: New Orleans After the Deluge, an online graphic novel serialized on SMITH Magazine. A.D. tells the real stories of seven New Orleans residents and their experiences during and after Hurricane Katrina. A.D. received extensive press coverage, including in such venues as the Los Angeles Times, the New Orleans Times-Picayune, the Atlanta Journal-Constitution, Rolling Stone, Wired.com, BoingBoing, the Toronto Star, and National Public Radio's "News & Notes". Through this work, and his later collaboration, The Influencing Machine, Neufeld leads an intense reflection about the way the media treats information.

In May 2008, it was announced that a four-color hardcover edition of A.D. would be published by Pantheon Graphic Novels. The book included 25% more story and art, as well as extensive revisions to the material from the webcomic. Debuting on August 18, 2009, shortly before Hurricane Katrina's fourth anniversary, A.D. went on to become a New York Times bestseller.

Other publications
His comics have also been published in The Atavist, Cartoon Movement, World War 3 Illustrated, FSB, NEA Arts, mMode magazine, ReadyMade, The Village Voice, The Chicago Reader, In These Times, and many other venues. Neufeld's illustrations have appeared in The New York Times, the Wall Street Journal, Forbes, Nickelodeon Magazine, the Austin American-Statesman, the Washington City Paper, New York Press, ShuttleSheet, and many other publications.

Neufeld is one of the founding members of the online comics collective ACT-I-VATE. In 2014 he joined the comics collective Hang Dai Editions (of whose founding members was his long-time friend Dean Haspiel).

Neufeld co-wrote the "motion comics" element of the ABC News documentary Earth 2100, which premiered on ABC on June 2, 2009. Neufeld worked on the sections of the documentary dealing with the fictional character "Lucy," who witnesses the apocalyptic effects of climate change and societal upheaval during the course of the 21st century.

His comics were introduced in France through Angoulême's International Comic Festival in 2012 and 2015.

Collaboration
Neufeld was a long-time artist for Pekar’s American Splendor, and has collaborated with many writers from outside the comics world, including poets, memoirists, and theatre groups. Other comics writers Neufeld has illustrated stories for include Pekar's wife Joyce Brabner (in American Splendor), and Greenberger in Duplex Planet Illustrated (published by Fantagraphics), R. Walker (in Titans of Finance), and Peter Ross (in a self-published mini-comic called Mortgage Your Soul).

Neufeld's collaborations with writers from outside the traditional comics world tend to be formalist and experimental in spirit. He has adapted a number of poet Nick Flynn's pieces into comics, which have appeared in various literary journals and websites. Neufeld is an Associate Artist with the New York-based theatre collective The Civilians, and has adapted portions of a number of their plays into comic book form. He has also collaborated with writer Eileen Myles, and Neufeld's mother, artist Martha Rosler. A special issue (subtitled "Of Two Minds") of Neufeld's comics series The Vagabonds was dedicated to his many collaborations.

Most recently, Neufeld collaborated with journalist Brooke Gladstone, co-host of WNYC radio's On the Media. Their book, published by W.W. Norton, is titled The Influencing Machine and was released in May 2011. Gladstone describes the book as "a treatise on the relationship between us and the news media, . . . a manifesto on the role of the press in American history as told through a cartoon version of [me] that would preside over each page."

Selected bibliography
Neufeld's website features a complete bibliography.

Graphic novels and creator-owned works 
 The Vagabonds (issues #1-2 Alternative Comics, 2003–2006; issues #3–6 Hang Dai Productions, 2014-2018)
 (as co-editor with Sari Wilson) Flashed: Sudden Stories in Comics and Prose (Pressgang, 2016) 
 (with Brooke Gladstone) The Influencing Machine (W. W. Norton & Company, 2011) 
 A.D.: New Orleans After the Deluge (SMITH Magazine 2007–2008; Pantheon, 2009) 
 A Few Perfect Hours (and Other Stories From Southeast Asia & Central Europe) (self-published through a grant from the Xeric Foundation, 2004) 
 (with writer R. Walker) Titans of Finance (Alternative Comics, 2001) 
 (with Dean Haspiel) Keyhole (issues #1-4 Millennium/Modern, 1996–1997; issues #5–6 Top Shelf Productions, 1998; issue #7 ("Keyhole 25") Hang Dai Productions, 2021)

Comics journalism stories 
 "Kansas City and the Case for Restitution Medicine," Harvard Public Health magazine (Fall 2022)
 “Vaccinated at the Ball: A True Story About Trusted Messengers,” The Journalist's Resource (June 13, 2022); reprinted in the Chicago Sun-Times Sunday edition
 “Clean Slate: A Student-Debt Forgiveness Story,” The Emancipator (Apr. 24, 2022)
 “A Tale of Two Pandemics: A Nonfiction Comic About Persistent Racial Disparities,” The Journalist’s Resource (Nov. 16, 2020)
 “Supply Chain Superhero,” PANDEMIX: Quarantine Comics in the Age of ‘Rona (July 2020)
 "A Brief Introduction to Differential Privacy: A Data Protection Plan for the 2020 Census,” The Journalist's Resource (Mar. 23, 2020)
 "A Graphic Guide to the 2020 US Census," The Journalist's Resource (Dec. 2, 2019)
 "Still Life: Thinking Outside the Casket," The Nib (Nov. 8, 2018)
 "The Trump-Russia memos: a graphic account of the so-called ‘dossier’ that had the media world buzzing," Columbia Journalism Review (Fall 2017)
 "Why We Break Our Stuff Accidentally-on-Purpose," Harvard Business School Working Knowledge (March 29, 2017)
 "Costumed Chaos in Times Square: The infamous street Elmos of NYC fight for their right to take selfies with tourists," The Nib (Sept. 26, 2016)
 "The Secret Life of Emojis," The Boston Globe (March 11, 2016)
 (with Adam Bessie) "A Scanner Constantly,” Pacific Standard (Feb. 8, 2016)
 (with Alia Malek and Peter van Agtmael) "The Road to Germany: $2400," Foreign Policy (Jan./Feb. 2016)
 (co-written with Michael Keller) "Fare Game: Taking the Rating Economy for a Ride," Al Jazeera America (Dec. 19, 2015)
 "Where are they now? Revisiting 4 Katrina survivors 10 years later," Fusion (Aug. 28, 2015)
 (with Adam Bessie) "Notification: You’ve Got Cancer," The Boston Globe (July 2, 2015)
 (with Martha Rosler) "Gift to the World,” The Art of Saving a Life (Bill & Melinda Gates Foundation, Feb. 2015)
 "Crossing the Line: Racial Profiling at the U.S. Border," Medium/The Nib (Jan. 5, 2015)
 (co-written with Michael Keller) "Terms of Service: Understanding Our Role in the World of Big Data," Al Jazeera America (Oct. 30, 2014)
 (with Adam Bessie) "The School is Not a Pipe" Truthout (Feb. 7, 2014)
 "SuperStorm Stories: a Red Hook Family," Medium/The Nib (Oct. 29, 2013)
 "Türk Cayi,” The Journal of the Knight-Wallace Fellows of the University of Michigan (2013)
 "Adventures in Comics Journalism," Mint's "The Small Picture" (2013)
 "The Bitumen Junket," The Journal of the Knight-Wallace Fellows of the University of Michigan (2012)
 (with Tori Marlan) "Stowaway," Atavist (May 2012)
 "Bahrain: Lines in Ink, Lines in the Sand," Cartoon Movement (Dec. 8, 2011)
 (with Martha Rosler) "Scenes From an Illicit War: From Planet Invisible," System Error: War is a Force That Gives Us Meaning (Silvana Editoriale, 2007)
 (with Harvey Pekar) "Global Warming," American Splendor (vol. 2) #2 (Vertigo, 2008)
 (with R. Walker) "Titans of Finance: Hoodoo," Drawn Bits (2002)
 (with R. Walker) "Titans of Finance: The Comic Book Villain," EXPO 2000 (2000)
 (with Harvey Pekar) "Stupid Capitalists," Green Magazine (Winter 2000)
 (with R. Walker) "Titans of Finance: Look the Part," SPX’99: The Comic (1999)
 (with R. Walker) "Titans of Finance: Ask Jay," Small Press Expo (1997)
 (with Harvey Pekar) "Andy Statman," The Village Voice (1996)

Awards
 2018 CASE Circle of Excellence Award (Bronze Medal: Writing for the Web). For “The Story of Why Humans Are So Careless with Their Phones” (Harvard Business School Working Knowledge)
 2018 American Society of Business Publication Editors (National First Place Award). For “The Story of Why Humans Are So Careless with Their Phones” (Harvard Business School Working Knowledge)
 2016 (nomination) One World Media Press Award, One World Media, London, England, UK. For “The Road to Germany: $2400” (Foreign Policy)
 2015 Economic Hardship Reporting Project Grant, Institute for Policy Studies, Washington, D.C. For “AD10K” (Fusion)
 2015 EPPY Award (Best Innovation Project on a Website), Editor & Publisher, New York City. For Terms of Service
 2014 Master Artist, Atlantic Center for the Arts, New Smyrna Beach, Florida
 2012 Knight-Wallace Fellowship in Journalism at the University of Michigan
 2012 (nomination) Eisner Award for Best Digital Comic ("Bahrain: Lines in Ink, Lines in the Sand")
 2010 (nomination) Harvey Award for Best Previously Published Graphic Album  (A.D.: New Orleans After the Deluge)
 2010 (nomination) Eisner Award for Best Graphic Album-Reprint (A.D.: New Orleans After the Deluge)
 2010 (nomination) Harry Chapin Media Award in the Book category (A.D.: New Orleans After the Deluge)
 2004 Xeric Award for A Few Perfect Hours (and Other Stories from Southeast Asia & Central Europe)
 (nomination) 1997 Ignatz Award for Outstanding Comic (Keyhole #2)
 1996 CAAP (Chicago Arts Assistance Program) Grant, City of Chicago Department of Cultural Affairs

Notes

References
 Sources consulted
 American Prospect online A.D. feature 
 USA Today'''s "Pop Candy" A.D.'' review
 N.Y. Daily News profile
 Interviews
 The Journalist's Resource interview
 NPR "News & Notes" interview
 Comicon.com "The Pulse" interview
 Sequential Tart interview

External links
 
 Interview with Josh Neufeld on BookBanter
 
 Josh Neufeld's illustration website
 A.D.: New Orleans After the Deluge

Alternative cartoonists
American bloggers
American graphic novelists
Artists from Brooklyn
Fiorello H. LaGuardia High School alumni
Oberlin College alumni
Writers from Brooklyn
Living people
1967 births
University of Michigan fellows
American Splendor artists